This is a list of episodes for the television series HaShminiya.

Series overview

Episodes

Season 1 (2005)

Season 2 (2006)

Season 3 (2006–07)

Season 4 (2013)

Season 5 (2014)

External links
 

Lists of Israeli drama television series episodes
Lists of science fiction television series episodes